Národní, formerly Národní třída, is one of the important avenues in Prague, capital of the Czech Republic.

It is placed on the boundary of New Town and Old Town, in the southwest direction from the centre of the city. This avenue connects Legion Bridge bridge with Jungmannovo náměstí. In medieval times, there were fortification walls.

In the 1900s, the name of the avenue was Nové Aleje (New Avenue, German: Neue Allee), but its name was changed through the years: V alejích, V nových alejích, V stromořadí, Uršulinská, U Řetězového mostu or Ferdinandova. In the 19th century, important buildings and institutions, such as the National Theatre and the Czech Academy of Sciences were built here.

On Friday November 17, 1989, riot police violently suppressed here a peaceful student demonstration, which is thought as the initiation of Velvet Revolution. Národní třída continued to be an eventful locale during the rest of the revolution.

See also 
 Národní třída (metro station)

References

Streets in Prague
Velvet Revolution